Soanierana-Ivongo is a district of Analanjirofo in Madagascar.

References 

Districts of Analanjirofo